Orville E. Birnstihl (December 27, 1917 – May 20, 2015) was an American farmer, businessman, and politician.

Birnstihl was born in Pillager, Minnesota. He served in the United States Army between 1945 and 1949.  Birnstihl lived in Fremont, Nebraska  and Boone, Iowa and operated the bus lines. He moved to Faribault, Minnesota, in 1970, with his wife and family. Birnstih owned a cattle ranch and farm in Faribault. He also was involved in the automobile business. Birnstihl served in the Minnesota House of Representatives from 1975 to 1978 and was a Democrat. He died in Clermont, Florida.

Notes

1917 births
2015 deaths
People from Cass County, Minnesota
People from Faribault, Minnesota
Military personnel from Minnesota
Businesspeople from Minnesota
Farmers from Minnesota
Democratic Party members of the Minnesota House of Representatives
United States Army personnel of World War II